Alexandra Oquendo (born February 3, 1984) is a Puerto Rican volleyball player who represented her home country at the 2016 Summer Olympics.

Career
She was part of the Puerto Rico women's national volleyball team at the 2014 FIVB Volleyball Women's World Championship in Italy. She participated at the 2016 Olympic Games in Rio de Janeiro.

Oquendo played for Leonas de Ponce in 2015 and Lancheras de Cataño for the 2016 Puerto Rican league season. When her club moved to Aibonito, she stayed with this club, then Polluelas de Aibonito.

Clubs
  Criollas de Caguas (2014)
  Leonas de Ponce (2015)
  Lancheras de Cataño (2016)
  Polluelas de Aibonito (2017)

References

External links
 FIVB Profile
 

1984 births
Living people
Puerto Rican women's volleyball players
Volleyball players at the 2015 Pan American Games
Pan American Games competitors for Puerto Rico
Sportspeople from San Juan, Puerto Rico
Volleyball players at the 2016 Summer Olympics
Middle blockers
Summer Olympics competitors for Puerto Rico
21st-century American women